Nurettin Yaşar (born 2 March 1961) is a Turkish politician from the Justice and Development Party (AKP), who has served as a Member of parliament for Malatya since 7 June 2015.

Early life and career 
Nurettin Yaşar was born in Malatya on 2 March 1961 to Hasan Yaşar and his wife Hatun. He completed his primary, secondary and high school education in Malatya. He graduated from Istanbul University Faculty of Law and worked as a freelance lawyer for six years. Yaşar is married with four children.

Political career

Member of Parliament 
Yaşar entered politics through the ruling Justice and Development Party (AKP), and was elected into the Grand National Assembly of Turkey in the June 2015 general election as an MP from Malatya Province. He was re-elected in November 2015.

References 

1961 births
Living people
Istanbul University alumni
Istanbul University Faculty of Law alumni
Justice and Development Party (Turkey) politicians
Members of the Grand National Assembly of Turkey
People from Malatya